Alexis Anne Mackenzie is a collage artist residing in San Francisco, California. Her work is best known for its detail, surreal elements, and incorporation of typography. She is a graduate of Tufts University and the School of the Museum of Fine Arts' combined degree program in Boston, Massachusetts.

References

Artists from California
Tufts University alumni
Living people
Year of birth missing (living people)